Herbert Hughes  may refer to:

 Herbert Hughes (composer) (1882–1937), Irish composer, music critic and collector of folk songs
 Herbert Delauney Hughes, known as Billy Hughes (educationist) (1914–1995), British Labour Party politician, MP and Principal of Ruskin College
Herbert Bristow Hughes (1821–1892), Australian pastoralist

See also
Herbert Hughes-Stanton, painter